Trinity Meadows Race Track was a large American horse racing track located in Willow Park, Parker County, Texas. The track operated in the 1960s without gambling as Clear Fork Downs, and was later named Squaw Creek Downs.

The new owner renamed the track Trinity Meadows and was one of the first horse racing tracks opened once Texas legalized parimutuel betting. The track opened in May 1991 with first year profit of $1.8 million and $1.3 the following year. Once nearby Lone Star Park opened, attendance plummeted and Trinity Meadows closed on August 6, 1996. The property was sold in 1997 at a bankruptcy auction.  The structures have since been demolished.

References

Defunct horse racing venues in the United States